Black Brook flows into the Seneca River by Waterloo, New York.

References

Rivers of Seneca County, New York
Rivers of New York (state)